Clarence "Pooh Bear" Williams (January 20, 1975 – February 17, 2022) was an American professional football player who was a running back for the Buffalo Bills in the National Football League (NFL). He played college football for the Florida State Seminoles. He attended Crescent City High School in Crescent City, Florida, where he rushed for 5,090 yards, the seventh most in Florida high school history at the time.

Williams played at Florida State from 1993–1996, rushing for 427 yards and scoring 17 touchdowns during his time there. After graduating, Williams went undrafted, but was signed by the Buffalo Bills. Williams had a brief career in the NFL during the 1998 season, appearing in 3 games and rushing for 5 yards over 2 carries.

From 2016 to 2019, Williams was head varsity football coach at Crescent City High School. In 2021, he began work as the defensive backs coach for Palatka High School.

Williams died in a traffic collision in Crescent City, on February 17, 2022, at the age of 47.

References

1975 births
2022 deaths
American football fullbacks
Buffalo Bills players
Florida State Seminoles football players
People from Crescent City, Florida
High school football coaches in Florida
Coaches of American football from Florida
Players of American football from Florida
African-American players of American football
Road incident deaths in Florida